Taoshui Town is an urban town in You County, Hunan Province, People's Republic of China.

Cityscape
The town is divided into 13 villages and one community, the following areas: Quantangchong Community, Xiaoji Village, Xiaquan Village, Wantian Village, Chujiaqiao Village, Zhurushan Village, Xiejiaping Village, Taoshui Village, Pantang Village, Mutang Village, Laojuntan Village, Mutian Village, Qingjiangqiao Village, and Zhuquan Village (泉塘冲社区、小集村、夏泉村、湾田村、褚家桥村、竹如山村、谢家坪村、桃水村、盘塘村、睦塘村、老君潭村、睦田村、清江桥村、竹泉村).

References

External links

Divisions of You County